The King of Rock 'n' Roll: The Complete 50's Masters is a five-disc box set compilation of the complete known studio master recordings by American singer and musician Elvis Presley during the decade of the 1950s. Issued in 1992 by RCA Records, catalog number 66050-2, it was soon followed by similar box sets covering Presley's musical output in the 1960s and 1970s. This set's initial long-box release included a set of collectible stamps duplicating the record jackets from every Presley LP on RCA Victor, every single that had a picture sleeve, and most of his EP releases. The set includes a booklet with an extensive session list and discography, and a lengthy essay by Peter Guralnick. It peaked at #159 on the album chart and was certified a gold record on August 7, 1992, by the RIAA. Further certifications were for platinum on November 20, 1992, and for double platinum on July 30, 2002.

Contents
The first four discs present the Elvis masters in chronological session order. Disc one commences with "My Happiness," a private test demo from the summer of 1953 at Sun Studio and the first recording ever made by Presley, and continues with the complete Sun Records masters through track 19.  The remainder of disc one, and discs two through four, comprise the entirety of his output for RCA Victor during the decade. Disc four ends with an interview by Presley prior to his departure overseas to serve in the army in 1958, released on the EP Elvis Sails. Included as well are the officially released recordings on RCA Victor for each one of Elvis' four feature films of the 1950s: Love Me Tender, Loving You, Jailhouse Rock, and King Creole.

The fifth disc compiles rare outtakes and unreleased recordings, starting off with the companion acetate to "My Happiness" in an early version of "That's When Your Heartaches Begin." Tracks two and five are more acetates recorded by the standard Presley trio of Elvis, Scotty Moore on guitar, and Bill Black on bass, at an unknown location in Lubbock, Texas, during January 1955, presumably around the time when Buddy Holly converted to rock and roll after seeing Presley in concert. Tracks three and four present live recordings from the Municipal Auditorium in Shreveport, Louisiana in 1955, again with the trio. Tracks thirteen through sixteen present live recordings from the Frontier Hotel in Las Vegas, Nevada, in 1956, with the trio plus drummer D.J. Fontana. An outtake from the Million Dollar Quartet sessions appears on track nine, with the following personnel: Presley, Carl Perkins on guitar, his brother Clayton on bass, Jerry Lee Lewis on piano, and W.S. Holland on drums. Although Johnny Cash is billed as the fourth of the headlining quartet and his presence is corroborated by anecdotal evidence, aural evidence of his participation on record is difficult to discern. The remainder of disc five contains alternate takes of released masters.

Collecting every master recording made in the 1950s, The King of Rock 'n' Roll encapsulates the era for which Presley remains most revered, that of the young international phenomenon at the forefront of the rock and roll explosion. RCA issued two similarly configured box set companions, one for the 1970s, and another for the 1960s, bypassing his film soundtrack work for his secular recordings made to be issued commercially.

Professional recordings made at Sun Studio, RCA Studios in New York and Nashville, Radio Recorders in Hollywood, and at the studio soundstages of 20th Century Fox, Paramount, and MGM in Hollywood. The furlough recording session of June 10, 1958, took place in RCA's newly constructed studio in Nashville, where Presley would continue to record through 1971. Original recordings produced by Sam Phillips or Steve Sholes.

This compilation received a 1992 Grammy nomination for Best Historical Album, only to lose that award to the boxed set The Complete Capitol Recordings of The Nat 'King' Cole Trio.

Track listing
Chart positions for LPs and EPs from Billboard Top Pop Albums chart; peak positions for EPA 4114 and EPA 4325 from EP chart commenced October 1957; positions for singles from Billboard Pop Singles chart. Certain recordings derive from acetates or from primitive recording equipment, and are not of professional sound quality; these are marked with an asterisk.

Disc one

+ overdubs added prior to release on LSP 3450

Disc two

Disc three

Disc four

Disc five: Rare and Rockin'

Personnel
 Elvis Presley – vocal, guitar, piano, percussion, bass guitar (on (You're So Square) Baby I Don't Care)
 Scotty Moore – lead guitar except "My Happiness", "We're Gonna Move", "Love Me Tender", "Poor Boy", "Let Me", "That's When Your Heartaches Begin", "I Need Your Love Tonight", "A Big Hunk O' Love", "Ain't That Loving You Baby", "(Now and Then There's) A Fool Such as I", "I Got Stung", and "Ain't That Loving You Baby (Fast Version)"
 Chet Atkins – acoustic rhythm guitar
 Hank Garland – lead guitar on "I Need Your Love Tonight", "A Big Hunk O' Love", "Ain't That Loving You Baby", "(Now and Then There's) A Fool Such as I", "I Got Stung", and "Ain't That Loving You Baby (Fast Version)"
 Tiny Timbrell – acoustic rhythm guitar, possible acoustic rhythm/lead guitar on "Steadfast, Loyal, and True"
 Floyd Cramer – piano
 Shorty Long – piano
 Dudley Brooks – piano
 Mike Stoller – piano
 Marvin Hughes – piano
 Bill Black – double bass except "My Happiness", "We're Gonna Move", "Love Me Tender", "Poor Boy", "Let Me", "That's When Your Heartaches Begin", "I Need Your Love Tonight", "A Big Hunk O' Love", "Ain't That Loving You Baby", "(Now and Then There's) A Fool Such as I", "I Got Stung", and "Ain't That Loving You Baby (Fast Version)"
 Bob Moore – double bass on "I Need Your Love Tonight", "A Big Hunk O' Love", "Ain't That Loving You Baby", "(Now and Then There's) A Fool Such as I", "I Got Stung", and "Ain't That Loving You Baby (Fast Version)"
 D.J. Fontana – drums
 Jimmie Lott – drums on "I'm Left, You're Right, She's Gone"
 Johnny Bernero – drums on "Tryin' to Get to You"
 Millie Kirkham – backing vocals 
 Ben Speer, Brock Speer – backing vocals on "I'm Counting On You", "I Was the One", and "I Want You, I Need You, I Love You"
The Jordanaires
 Gordon Stoker – piano, backing vocals
 Hoyt Hawkins – backing vocals, organ
 Neal Matthews – backing vocals, bass, guitar
 Hugh Jarrett – backing vocals
 Ray Walker – backing vocals
Love Me Tender Sessions
 Vito Mumolo – guitar on "Love Me Tender", "Poor Boy", "We're Gonna Move", and "Let Me"
 Myer Rubin – double bass on "Love Me Tender", "Poor Boy", "We're Gonna Move", and "Let Me"
 Richard Cornell – drums on "Love Me Tender", "Poor Boy", "We're Gonna Move", and "Let Me"
 Luther "Red" Roundtree – banjo on "Love Me Tender", "Poor Boy", "We're Gonna Move", and Let Me"
 Dominic Frontieri – accordion on "Love Me Tender", "Poor Boy", "We're Gonna Move", and "Let Me"
 Ken Darby Trio – backing vocals on "Love Me Tender", "Poor Boy", "We're Gonna Move", and "Let Me"
Million Dollar Quartet
 Carl Perkins – lead guitar and vocals on "Reconsider Baby"
 Jerry Lee Lewis – piano on "Reconsider Baby"
 Clayton Perkins – bass on "Reconsider Baby"
 W.S. Holland – drums on "Reconsider Baby"
 Johnny Cash – possible vocals on "Reconsider Baby"

Charts

References

Elvis Presley compilation albums
1992 compilation albums
RCA Records compilation albums
Albums recorded at Sun Studio
Compilation albums published posthumously